Karadağlar is a Turkish television drama loosely based on the 1880 novel The Brothers Karamazov by Fyodor Dostoyevsky. It airs on Show TV every week on Monday evenings at 20:00 local time, and is repeated on Wednesdays at 23:00, as well as on Sundays at 16:45.

Overview
Karadağlar is set in the 1930s, when Turkey was suffering the effects of the Great Depression, and it focuses on the generally strained relationships of the landowner, Halit Karadağ, with his sons, as well as the relationships between his sons. Set in the fictional village of Payidar, the series also shows the tensions that exist between the area's rich landowners and poor villagers.

Cast

Main characters

Episodes

References

External links
 Show TV page dedicated to the series 
 The website karadaglar.gen.tr exclusively devoted to the series 

2010 Turkish television series debuts
Turkish drama television series
Television series by Med Yapım
Television shows based on Russian novels
Show TV original programming
The Brothers Karamazov